Columbia Lake Provincial Park is a provincial park in British Columbia, Canada, located on the northeast shore of Columbia Lake south of the town of Invermere.

References

External links
BC Parks page "Columbia Lake"

See also
Columbia Lake Ecological Reserve

Provincial parks of British Columbia
Parks in the Regional District of East Kootenay
Columbia Valley
1988 establishments in British Columbia
Protected areas established in 1988